Kannarin Thawornsak (born 27 May 1997) is a Thai professional footballer who plays as a defensive midfielder for Thai League 1 club Muangthong United.

International career
In 2020, He played the 2020 AFC U-23 Championship with Thailand U23.

Honours
Thailand U-19
 AFF U-19 Youth Championship: 2019

References

External links

1997 births
Living people
Kannarin Thawornsak
Kannarin Thawornsak
Association football midfielders
Kannarin Thawornsak
Kannarin Thawornsak
Kannarin Thawornsak
Kannarin Thawornsak
Kannarin Thawornsak
Kannarin Thawornsak